Charles Edward Barnabe (June 12, 1900 – August 16, 1977) was a pitcher in Major League Baseball. He played for the Chicago White Sox.

References

External links

Major League Baseball pitchers
Chicago White Sox players
Big Spring Barons players
Dallas Steers players
Edmonton Elks players
Evansville Evas players
Evansville Little Evas players
Evansville Pocketeers players
Fort Worth Panthers players
Little Rock Travelers players
Portland Beavers players
Shreveport Sports players
St. Paul Saints (AA) players
Waco Cubs players
Yakima Indians players
Baseball players from Colorado
1900 births
1977 deaths
People from Gilpin County, Colorado